Law in Denmark follows a civil law system.

Private law
 The  governs labour law concerning salaried employees. The  governs vacation time for employees.
 The  governs consumer law.
 The  governs landlord–tenant law.
 Privacy law in Denmark

Public law
 The  is the criminal code.
 The  governs urban planning.
 The  governs social programs.
 Abortion in Denmark
 Danish nationality law

History
The , or the Danish Code of 1683, promoted unity. The law has been developed via judicial decisions and royal decrees. Roman law has not had much influence on the law of Denmark.

See also
Courts of Denmark
Constitution of Denmark

References
Blume, Peter. In Winterton and Moys. Information Sources in Law. Second Edition. Bowker-Saur. 1997. Chapter Nine: Denmark. Pages 149 to 162.

External links
Guide to Law Online - Denmark from the Library of Congress
Danish legislation in English

Law of Denmark